"Go Away" may refer to:
 "Go Away" (2NE1 song), 2011
 "Go Away" (Gloria Estefan song), 1993
 "Go Away" (Lorrie Morgan song), 1997
 "Go Away" (Weezer song), 2015
 "Go Away", a song by Cold from Cold
 "Go Away", a song by Elvis Costello from Momofuku
 "Go Away", a song by Honeycrack from Prozaic
 "Go Away", a song by Living Colour from Stain
 "Go Away", a song by Steve Perry from Street Talk
 Go Away (film), an upcoming American slasher film